Four Seasons is a c. 1617-1620 oil on canvas painting by Guido Reni, now in the Museo di Capodimonte in Naples.  A 1618-1620 studio copy of the work is now in the Kunsthistorisches Museum in Vienna.

A print by Franz Valentin Durmer from the late 18th or early 19th century, based on the painting is held in the permanent collection of the Victoria and Albert Museum.

History

References

Paintings by Guido Reni
1620 paintings
Allegorical paintings
Paintings in the collection of the Museo di Capodimonte
Nude art